Neptis nicomedes is a species of nymphalid butterfly.

Description
The uppersides of the wings are dark brown. Both wings are crossed in the middle by a broad band of white, followed by a band of indistinct grey spots and by three sub-marginal linear bands of white. The underside is similar to the upperside, but colours are paler.

Distribution
This species can be found in tropical western Africa, mainly in Sierra Leone, Angola, Democratic Republic of the Congo, Uganda and western Kenya.

References
 BioLib.cz
 "Neptis Fabricius, 1807" at Markku Savela's Lepidoptera and Some Other Life Forms

Butterflies described in 1874
nicomedes
Butterflies of Africa
Taxa named by William Chapman Hewitson